Dheeraj Kumar can refer to:

 Dheeraj Kumar (born 1944), Indian actor
 Dheeraj Kumar (cricketer, born 1994), Indian cricketer
 Dheeraj Kumar (cricketer, born 1999), Indian cricketer